Dante Marioni (born March 3, 1964 in Mill Valley, California) is an American glass artist.

Biography
Dante Marioni grew up among many artistic influences. His father, Paul Marioni, was involved in the American studio glass movement and, as a result, Dante was constantly exposed to the glassblowing artists of the San Francisco Bay Area. His uncles are artists, Tom Marioni and Joseph Marioni.

In 1979, the Marioni family moved to Seattle and Dante began to study glassblowing at The Glass Eye. He spent summers at the Pilchuck Glass School in Stanwood, Washington where his father taught. After graduating from high school, he started to pursue glassblowing as a career; working full-time at The Glass Eye. Marioni learned the art of glassblowing from masters like Lino Tagliapietra, Benjamin Moore, and Richard Marquis. He has taught in the United States, Australia, New Zealand, Japan, and Europe.

About his work
Marioni’s ensemble of glass vessels includes variations of vases, goblets, flasks, cups, and pitchers. His works reveal combinations of classical Greek, Italian, and modern forms using opaque and transparent colors. Some of Marioni’s pieces employ 'reticello', which resembles a net, and murrine (mosaic) techniques. As he has refined his technical skills, he tends to design with tall, sleek shapes.(see external link below)

References

Bibliography
Oldknow, Tina. Dante Marioni: Blown Glass. New York: Hudson Hills Press, 2000. .

External links
 Dante Marioni Glass
 Dante Marioni Online

1964 births
Living people
American glass artists
American contemporary artists
Glassblowers
Pacific Northwest artists
Fellows of the American Craft Council